Michael Lumb (born 9 January 1988) is a retired Danish professional footballer who played as a left-back.

Career

AGF
Lumb was born in Aarhus, Denmark to a Danish mother and an English father. He is left-footed and plays left back. He came from AGF's 1988-born Danish Youth Championship-winning team, a side that included Morten Beck Andersen, Frederik Krabbe, Michael Vester, Niels Kristensen, Jesper Blicher and Anders Syberg. Lumb was named the young gun "Shooting Star" of the autumn season 2007–08 by the Danish newspaper Ekstra Bladet.

Despite his youth age, Lumb played more than 100 matches for AGF in the Danish Superliga and First Division.

On 11 January 2010, it was reported on AGF's website that he was moving to Zenit Saint Petersburg in the Russian Premier League.

Zenit Saint Petersburg and loans

Lumb signed a three-year contract with Zenit Saint Petersburg. In Zenit, Lumb faced a tough competition for a left back position with likes of Slovak international Tomáš Hubočan, and as a result did not play much. Lumb played for the first team just twice in the first half of 2010 season, and the arrival of another international left defender Aleksandar Luković meant he had to move to get any playing minutes.

Lumb was initially loaned out to Dutch side Feyenoord, but the move proved unsuccessful, as he was of cause relegated to the bench and then in the stands. He was subsequently recalled and loaned to his homeland club AaB.

Lumb returned to Zenit in summer 2011, to a team that, in addition to Hubočan and Luković, had signed Italy national team left wing-back Domenico Criscito. Lumb spent the rest of the year playing for the reserves, occasionally as a centre-back.

After having been on trial first, Lumb was signed by SC Freiburg on 17 January 2012 until the end of the season on a loan deal. He made his debut for the club on 21 January, when he was in the starting eleven in a 1–0 win over FC Augsburg. He immediately made an impact, providing the assist for debutante Matthias Ginter's winning goal in the 88th minute. Overall, Lumb only made five appearances for Freiburg during the 2011–12 season. In June 2012, Lumb returned to Zenit.

Bochum
On 25 January 2013, Lumb signed a contract until the end of the season with VfL Bochum. He made his debut for the club on 10 February in a 0–2 home loss against SSV Jahn Regensburg.

Vestsjælland
On 19 June 2013, Lumb signed a two-year contract with Vestsjælland. Upon signing, manager Ove Pedersen called Lumb "mentally very strong" and stated that he needed to work on "getting his career back on track". A few days later, OB director of sports Jesper Hansen revealed, that he had negotiated a contract with Lumb, but that the latter had eventually decided to sign with Vestsjælland. He made his debut for the club on 21 July in a 1–1 league draw against Brøndby. He suffered a knee injury in December 2013, which required surgery. He was, however, able to play most of the games during the spring on pain killers. He finished the 2013–14 season with 30 total appearances, as FCV ended in ninth place in the league table, six points clear of relegation.

In June 2014, Lumb had surgery for his persistent knee injury, with the first reports being that he would be sidelined him for some months. In September 2014, the injury proved to be worse than expected, and Lumb was announced to be out for the rest of 2014. He made his comeback on 22 March 2015 in a 0–1 home loss to Brøndby. He was in the starting lineup for the game, but was substituted in the second half for Jean-Claude Bozga. He also appeared in the Danish Cup final on 14 May 2015, as Vestsjælland lost 2–3 in extra time to Copenhagen. Lumb finished the season with 9 total appearances, as he struggled with injury. Vestsjælland suffered relegation from the Superliga at the end of the season and Lumb's contract expired, making him a free agent.

Lyngby
On 17 July 2015, Lumb signed a one-year contract with Lyngby Boldklub, competing in the second-tier 1st Division. Earlier that summer, there were persistent rumours of him rejoining his former club AGF, but a move eventually fell through. Following his move to Lyngby, Lumb said that the "determined" approach of manager David Nielsen had convinced him to sign for the club. He made his debut for the club on 9 August in a 1–0 league win over Silkeborg. 

Following promotion in his first season at the club, Lumb scored his first goal for the club on 21 April 2017 in a 2–1 win in the Superliga over SønderjyskE.

Horsens
On 31 August 2018, Lumb signed a three-year contract with AC Horsens. After signing, Lumb said that he could still develop as a player and praised manager Bo Henriksen's style of play which involved attacking full-backs. He made his debut on 16 September in a 3–2 league win over his former club AGF, coming on as a substitute in the 83rd minute for Hallur Hansson. On 26 November, he scored his first goal for Horsens in the return game against AGF. In the 43rd minute, he fired a long-range shot at AGF-goalkeeper Kasper Kristensen, who failed to save the ball, which bounced off his gloves and into the net. Horsens won the game 2–1. At the end of the season, Lumb was nominated for Horsens Player of the Season, but saw himself beaten by team captain Hallur Hansson. He finished the season with 24 appearances in which he scored three goals.

He continued as a starter at left-back in the 2019–20 season, and attracted interest from clubs abroad. In January 2020, Horsens manager Bo Henriksen confirmed that Greek club Larissa had put in a bid for Lumb's services, as well as an unnamed Turkish club. Horsens ended the regular season – which had been suspended due to the COVID-19 pandemic – in eighth place, but qualified for the Superliga European play-offs by ending first in their group in the relegation round. They were, however, eventually knocked out over two legs to OB. Lumb made 35 total appearances that season, in which he scored three goals.

Horsens started the 2020–21 season poorly under new manager Jonas Dal, who had replaced the outgoing Bo Henriksen. Lumb tested positive for SARS‑CoV‑2 on 14 October 2020. He returned to action on 8 November in a 0–3 league loss to SønderjyskE.

Brøndby
On 4 January 2021, it was announced that Lumb had signed a one-year contract with Brøndby, replacing regular left-back Blas Riveros who had suffered a season-ending injury. He made his official debut for the club on 4 March as a starter at left wing-back in manager Niels Frederiksen's 3–5–2 formation. He was replaced at half-time for Oskar Fallenius as the match ended in a 0–0 draw. He finished his first six months at Brøndby with only two appearances, as he struggled to make the team. The club would go on the win its first league title in 16 years, which was also Lumb's first league title in his career.

Lumb made a total of three appearances for the club, before he left the club at the end of 2021, where his contract expired.

Fremad Amager
On 10 January 2022, Lumb signed a deal for the rest of the season with Danish 1st Division club Fremad Amager. He made his competitive debut for the club on 19 February in a 1–1 away draw against Jammerbugt as a starter at left-back. His first goal for the club came on 13 May, slotting home a low cross from a corner kick to deliver the 1–0 winner against HB Køge.  

On 7 March 2023, Lumb confirmed that he had decided to retire. His contract with Fremad Amager was therefore terminated.

Career statistics

Honours 
Zenit Saint Petersburg
 Russian Cup: 2009–10

Brøndby
Danish Superliga: 2020–21

Individual
 Danish U-21 Player of the Year 2008

References

External links 

Official Danish league stats at danskfodbold.com 

1988 births
Living people
Footballers from Aarhus
Association football defenders
Danish men's footballers
Danish expatriate men's footballers
Danish people of British descent
Danish people of English descent
Denmark international footballers
Denmark under-21 international footballers
Fuglebakken KFUM players
Aarhus Gymnastikforening players
FC Zenit Saint Petersburg players
Feyenoord players
AaB Fodbold players
SC Freiburg players
VfL Bochum players
FC Vestsjælland players
AC Horsens players
Brøndby IF players
Fremad Amager players
Danish Superliga players
Russian Premier League players
Eredivisie players
Bundesliga players
2. Bundesliga players
Danish 1st Division players
Expatriate footballers in Russia
Expatriate footballers in the Netherlands
Expatriate footballers in Germany
Danish expatriate sportspeople in Russia
Danish expatriate sportspeople in the Netherlands
Danish expatriate sportspeople in Germany